Chlorocypha trifaria is a species of damselfly in the family Chlorocyphidae. It is found in the Republic of the Congo, the Democratic Republic of the Congo, Uganda, and possibly Sudan. Its natural habitats are subtropical or tropical moist lowland forests and rivers. It is threatened by habitat loss.

References

Chlorocyphidae
Insects described in 1899
Taxonomy articles created by Polbot